Jalan Pantai Baharu is a major road in Kuala Lumpur, Malaysia.

Landmarks
Menara Telekom
Kerinchi Pylon

List of junctions

Roads in Kuala Lumpur